Sodium fumarate, also called disodium fumarate, is a compound with the molecular formula Na2C4H2O4. It is the sodium salt of fumaric acid, used as an acidity regulator in processed foods. Sodium fumarate and fumaric acid are sometimes used as terminal electron acceptors in the cultivation of certain anaerobic microorganisms. It appears as an odourless, white, crystalline powder and is soluble in water.

References

Fumarates
Organic sodium salts